Leucojum vernum, called the spring snowflake, is a species of flowering plant in the family Amaryllidaceae. It is native to central and southern Europe from Belgium to Ukraine. It is considered naturalized in north-western Europe, including Great Britain and parts of Scandinavia, and in the US states of Georgia and Florida. This spring flowering bulbous herbaceous perennial is cultivated as an ornamental for a sunny position. The plant multiplies in favourable conditions to form clumps.

The Latin specific epithet vernum means "relating to Spring". Its close relative, Leucojum aestivum, flowers in summer.

Description
The flowering stem (scape) has a small central cavity and two narrow wings. The pendent flowers appear in spring and are usually solitary, rarely in an umbel of two. The flowers have six white tepals, each with a greenish or yellowish mark just below the tip. Each tepal is 15–25 mm long. The whitish seeds are about 7 mm long.

Taxonomy
Leucojum vernum was first described by Carl Linnaeus in 1753. The epithet vernum means "of the spring".

Varieties
Two varieties are accepted by the World Checklist of Selected Plant Families:
Leucojum vernum var. carpathicum Sweet – Carpathian Mountains (Czech Republic, Romania, Ukraine)
Leucojum vernum var. vernum
A third variety is recognized by some sources, but not by the World Checklist of Selected Plant Families:
Leucojum vernum var. vagneri Stapf

Leucojum vernum var. carpathicum is distinguished by the presence of yellow rather than greenish markings at the tip of each tepal. Sources that distinguish var. vagneri from var. vernum describe it as more vigorous and flowering earlier, with two flowers per scape. It comes true from seed as it does not cross with var. vernum.

Distribution and habitat
Leucojum vernum is native to central Europe and parts of southern and western Europe, including 
Austria, Belgium, the Czech Republic, Slovakia, Germany, Hungary, Poland, Switzerland, France, Italy, Romania, former Yugoslavia and Ukraine. It has become naturalized in other parts of Europe, including Great Britain, the Netherlands and parts of Scandinavia, and in Georgia and Florida in the United States. It is found in damp and shady habitats, including woods, up to elevations of 1600 m.

Cultivation
Leucojum vernum is cultivated as an ornamental plant for its white flowers in spring. It is described as "easy to grow", either in sun or partial shade, particularly in moist soil and in grass. The species  has gained the Royal Horticultural Society's Award of Garden Merit.

Cultivars
Many cultivars are available, including:
'Butter-churn' (L. vernum) – large yellowish flowers, one or two per stem, sometimes two fused together
'Eva Habermeier' (L. vernum) – yellow apical marks
'Gertrude Wister' (L. v. var. carpathicum) – semi-double
'Golden Bell' (L. v. var. carpathicum) – yellow ovary and tepal markings
'Green Lantern' (L. v. var. vernum) – vigorous, tepals about one-third green with a sharp apex
'Greengotts' (L. v. var. vagneri) – second earliest to flower, large apical green markings
'Hoch die Tassen' (L. v. var. vernum) – flowers face upwards ( means 'raise your glasses')
'Janus' (L. v. var. vagneri) – flowers early, in the first week of January
'Klara' (L. v. var. carpathicum) – smaller stature, open, funnel-like flowers
'Lothar' (L. vernum) – long pedicels, up to three flowers per bulb
'Milly' (L. v. var. vernum) – one to six extra long, narrow, completely green tepals; comes true from seed
'Null Punkte' (L. v. var. vernum) – markings small or absent
'Podpolozje' (L. v. var. carpathicum) – large flowers with a large apical mark, mostly two flowers per stem
'Tentacular' (L. vernum) – double, green markings

Toxicity
All species of Leucojum are poisonous, as the leaves and bulbs contain the toxic alkaloids lycorine and galantamine. Galantamine is used for the treatment of cognitive decline in mild to moderate Alzheimer's disease and various other memory impairments.

References

External links
 
 

Amaryllidoideae
Flora of Central Europe
Flora of France
Flora of Southeastern Europe
Flora of Ukraine
Plants described in 1753
Taxa named by Carl Linnaeus
Garden plants of Europe